Elk's Run is a comic book limited series created by writer Joshua Hale Fialkov, artist Noel Tuazon, and colorist Scott A. Keating. It was published in book form on March 27, 2007, by Villard. It was nominated in the categories of Best Writer, Best Artist, Best Letterer, Best Cover Artist, Best New Talent, Best Continuing or Limited Series, and Best Single Issue or Story (for issue #3) for the 2006 Harvey Awards.

References

See also
Echoes
I, Vampire
The Last of the Greats

Comic book limited series